"You Bring Me Down" is a 2006 single by the English alternative rock band, Blood Red Shoes. It was later re-recorded and re-issued by the band as their first CD release in early 2008. The limited-edition vinyl release was the version that was featured on the band's I'll Be Your Eyes compilation.

The re-issued version was their first release available on CD and download and became their first single to chart, peaking at #64 on the UK Singles Chart.

Track listing (2006)

7" 
 "You Bring Me Down"
 "Try Harder"

Track listing (2008)

7" #1 
 "You Bring Me Down"
 "Can't Find The Door"

7" #2 
 "You Bring Me Down"
 "How To Pass The Time"

CD 
 "You Bring Me Down"
 "Twelve Hours Late"
 "I Wish I Was Someone Better"  (Metal On Metal Remix)

Download 
 "You Bring Me Down"
 "You Bring Me Down"  (Live)

Charts

References

2006 singles
2008 singles
2006 songs
V2 Records singles